Hunsur Ramachandra Bhagyachandra, known mononymously as Bhargava, is an Indian film director who worked primarily in Kannada cinema. Originally a producer, he came to be considered one of the best directors in Kannada cinema, and he was awarded the Puttanna Kanagal Award, the highest award in Kannada cinema, in 2012. he has directed 50 films.

Early life 

Bhargava was born in Madhwa Brahmin family, Hunsur taluk in the Mysore State (now Karnataka). Before becoming an independent director, he worked as an associate/assistant director with stalwarts of the time like Hunsur Krishnamurthy, Siddalingaiah, Vijay, Geethapriya and K.S.R. Das in many successful movies like Bangaarada Manushya, Bhaktha Khumbara, Babruvaahana, Naa Ninna Marayalaare, Mayor Muthanna, etc. This gave him a rich experience and moulded his career to become a famous director. He has many disciples who have become successful directors like S. Narayan, Phani Ramachandra, Chandrashekar Sharma. In many of his interviews he has expressed gratitude to director Hunsur Krishnamurthy and famous comedian Dwarakeesh.

Career 
Bhargava began his career in films as a film producer. Having produced eight films, he turned to direction. He made his debut as a director in 1977 with Bhagyavantharu with Rajkumar and B. Saroja Devi playing the lead roles. His next film Olavu Geluvu (1977) had Rajkumar and Lakshmi in lead roles. His next film Asaadhya Aliya was with Vishnuvardhan and proved successful. He has directed 23 films for Dr. Vishnuvardhan with a high success rate for the combination like Jeevana Chakra, Karunamayi, Jana Naayaka, Hrudaya Geethe, Karna, Mathe Haadithu Kogile, Onde Guri, Krishna Nee Begane Baaro and many more. He has directed seven films for Ambareesh, four films for Anant Nag, two films for Shankar Nag, two films for Shiva Rajkumar and many other actors. He has three decades of film-making to his credit and also produced seven successful films. He is the only film director to have two silver Jubilee functions at the same place and same time. The mighty and historical Gandugali Kumara Rama was his 50th film. Music Directors Rajan-Nagendra have worked with him in more than 20 films. He has also worked with nationally noted music directors such as Laxmikant Pyarelal, Bappi Lahiri, Satyam and Gurukiran.

Filmography

References

External links 

Kannada film directors
Living people
Kannada screenwriters
Date of birth missing (living people)
Telugu film directors
People from Mysore district
Film directors from Karnataka
20th-century Indian film directors
21st-century Indian film directors
20th-century Indian dramatists and playwrights
Screenwriters from Karnataka
Year of birth missing (living people)